Blaž Kavčič was the defending champion, but lost to his compatriot Aljaž Bedene in the second round.

Fourth seed Paolo Lorenzi won the title, defeating third seed Grega Žemlja 6–2, 6–4 in the final.

Seeds

Draw

Finals

Top half

Bottom half

References
 Main Draw
 Qualifying Draw

BMW Ljubljana Open - Singles
BMW Ljubljana Open